The 1965 Utah Redskins football team was an American football team that represented the University of Utah as a member of the Western Athletic Conference (WAC) during the 1965 NCAA University Division football season. In their eighth and final season under head coach Ray Nagel, the Redskins compiled an overall record of 3–7 with a mark of 1–3 against conference opponents, placing fifth in the WAC. Home games were played on campus at Ute Stadium in Salt Lake City.

Following a 2–2 start, Utah won just once in the final six games. After the season, in December, Nagel left Utah to become the head football coach at the University of Iowa.

Schedule

NFL Draft
One Utah player was selected in the 1966 NFL Draft.

References

Utah
Utah Utes football seasons
Utah Redskins football